Jamestown: Legend of the Lost Colony, also known as simply Jamestown, is a vertically scrolling shoot 'em up video game developed and released by Final Form Games in 2011. The game takes place on Mars in an alternate history steampunk 17th century, where the planet is a British colony contested by the Spanish and the indigenous Martians.

Plot

Gameplay 
Jamestown features mechanics similar to many other shooters. There are 4 types of ships available, each with a primary and secondary attack, and a "Vaunt Mode" which the player can trigger when enough gold from destroyed enemies has been collected. When this mode is engaged the ship gains a temporary shield, increased firepower and a score multiplier for a limited time, which can be prolonged and increased by collecting more gold.

The game is playable in both regular singleplayer mode and in a local multiplayer mode supporting up to 4 players.

Development 
The game was developed in two years by the small indie developer Final Form Games, and financed by the three founders' own personal savings. The developers present the Cave shooter Progear as being the closest thing to a direct influence, and say that the animated films of Hayao Miyazaki, in particular Nausicaä of the Valley of the Wind and Castle in the Sky influenced the artstyle.  The story's alternate history references Roanoke Colony, and includes associated figures like Walter Raleigh, Virginia Dare, John Smith, and Joachim Gans as characters.

Reception 

Jamestown and Jamestown+ received "generally favorable reviews" according to the review aggregation website Metacritic. IGN called the PC version "an accessible, punchy shooter with some clever mechanics at play and a surprising level of depth hiding beneath the 16-bit surface". 1UP.com praised its approachable, escalating difficulty, the 16-bit style graphics and its soundtrack.

Jamestown was selected as one of the "PAX 10" (a selection of the years best indie games) for the PAX Prime 2011 convention. The game was added to the Humble Indie Bundle 4 on December 13, 2011.

References

External links 
 
 
 

2011 video games
Alternate history video games
Cooperative video games
Indie video games
Linux games
Multiplayer and single-player video games
MacOS games
PlayStation 4 games
Vertically scrolling shooters
Steampunk video games
Video games developed in the United States
Video games set on Mars
Windows games
Video games based on real people
Cultural depictions of Walter Raleigh